The Battle of Bordeaux may refer to:

Battle of Bordeaux (732)
Battle of Bordeaux (1653)
Battle of Bordeaux (1938 FIFA World Cup)